Sir William Dolben, 3rd Baronet (1727–1814) was a British Tory MP and a zealous campaigner for the abolition of slavery.

He was born in Finedon, Northamptonshire, the only surviving son of Sir John Dolben, 2nd Baronet and his wife Elizabeth Digby (died 1730), daughter of William Digby, 5th Baron Digby and Lady Jane Noel. He was educated at Westminster School and Christ Church, Oxford, matriculating in 1744. After leaving Oxford he married in 1748 Judith, daughter of Somerset English, heiress to a considerable fortune. In 1756 he inherited the baronetcy on the death of his father.

He was appointed High Sheriff of Northamptonshire for 1760 and in 1766 a verderer of Rockingham Forest. After a short period in early 1768 as a stopgap MP for Oxford University, he was returned at the general election in March 1768 as MP for Northamptonshire from 1768 to 1774. In 1780 he was re-adopted by the university and represented them again from 1780 until 1806. On 20 April 1797, he was appointed captain in the Northamptonshire volunteer cavalry regiment.

During his long parliamentary career as an independent MP, he was a fervent advocate of parliamentary reform and the abolition of slavery. He took up the abolitionist cause after he chanced to visit a slave ship docked in the port of London; the conditions he found on the ship so horrified him that he resolved at once to work for abolition. With the support of other abolitionists Dolben put forward a bill in 1788 to regulate conditions on board slave ships which was passed as the Slave Trade Act 1788 by a large majority.

After the death of his first wife in 1771, he married in 1789 a second cousin, Charlotte Scotchmer, née Affleck. He died in Bury St Edmunds in 1814, aged eighty-seven, and was buried at Finedon church. He was succeeded in the title and estates by John English Dolben, his only surviving son from his first marriage.

References

1727 births
1814 deaths
People from Finedon
High Sheriffs of Northamptonshire
Members of the Parliament of Great Britain for Oxford University
Members of the Parliament of Great Britain for English constituencies
British MPs 1768–1774
British MPs 1780–1784
British MPs 1784–1790
British MPs 1790–1796
British MPs 1796–1800
Members of the Parliament of the United Kingdom for the University of Oxford
UK MPs 1801–1802
UK MPs 1802–1806
Baronets in the Baronetage of England
English abolitionists
People educated at Westminster School, London
Alumni of Christ Church, Oxford